Sea Life Benalmádena is an aquarium located in Benalmádena (suburb of Málaga) in Andalusia, Spain.

It is one of the Sea Life Centres in Europe, which are owned by Merlin Entertainments.

External links

Sea Life Centres
Aquaria in Spain
Province of Málaga